Amin Farhan Jejo (also Ameen Farhan Jejo) is a Yazidi politician and author.

Career 
Amin Farhan Jejo was one of the leaders of the Yazidi-interest party, Yazidi Movement for Reform and Progress. In December 2005, Amin Farhan Jejo was given a seat in the Iraqi parliament when his Yazidi Movement for Reform and Progress party won 0.2 percent of the country's vote.

Works 
Amin Farhan Jejo published books about Yazidi nationalism and the Yazidi language.  One of his books is titled The Yezidi Nationalism: Its Roots, Constituents and Sufferings and another of his books is titled The Origins of the Yezidi Language.

References 

Yazidi people
Iraqi politicians
Iraqi writers